Enghave Brygge (English: Enghave Quay) is a waterfront area in the Southern Docklands of Copenhagen, Denmark. It is located between Teglholmen to the south and Kalvebod Brygge to the north. Currently an abandoned industrial site, a plan for its redevelopment was adopted in July 2013. The most prominent landmark in the area is the H. C. Ørsted Power Station.

Redevelopment

The land is owned by NPV A/S, JM Danmark samt By & Havn. The plan for the area has been created by Juul Frost Arkitekter, Gröning Arkitekter and Danielsen Architecture in collaboration with the City. The area will comprise 2,400 apartments and about 37.800 square metres of commercial and retail space. A central element in the plan is the creation of a 700 metres long canal, Enghave Canal, which will be a modern equivalent to Christianshavn Canal on the other side of the harbor. The buildings along the water will be located on 11 individual "islands". A greenspace will mark the transition to H. C. Ørsted Power Station.

Transport
Enghave Brygge will be a station on the planned South Harbour Line (M4) of the Copenhagen Metro, due to open in 2024. Bridges will connect Enghave Brygge to Teglholmen to the south and across the harbor to the southern part of Islands Brygge.

Cultural references
Enghave Brygge is seen in silhouet st 0:42:28 in the first Olsen Gang film. In The Last Exploits of the Olsen Gang (1974), Bøffen (Ove Verner Hansen) tries to make Egon (Ove Sprogøe) "disappear and stay disappeared" by embedding his feet in a concrete block and dumping him into the harbor from a crane at one of the scrapyards on Enghave Brygge (1:12:25). Enghave Brygge is also used as a location at 0:43:46 in The Olsen Gang on the Track. Enghave Brygge is also used as a location at 0:28:00 in The Olsen Gang Outta Sight.

See also
 Frederiks Brygge

References

External links
 Local plan proposal

Copenhagen city districts
Land reclamation in Copenhagen